Ulyakhino is a rural locality (a village) and the administrative center of Ulyakhinskoye Rural Settlement, Gus-Khrustalny District, Vladimir Oblast, Russia. The population was 516 as of 2010.

Geography 
Ulyakhino is located 42 km south of Gus-Khrustalny (the district's administrative centre) by road. Sivtsevo is the nearest rural locality.

References 

Rural localities in Gus-Khrustalny District